Santoshgad (also referred to as Tathavade, the name of the closest village) is a fort in Phaltan taluka of Satara district in Maharashtra, India. Santoshgad hill fort (Phaltan T; 17� 57' N, 74� 20' E; RS. Lonand, 2.9 m.) lies in the north-west corner of the Phaltan taluka, about 12 miles south-west of Phaltan.

See also

List of forts in Maharashtra

References

External links
A description of the fort from the Maharashtra state government gazetteer.

Forts in Satara district